The word sziget means island in Hungarian. It can also refer to:

Localities
 Szigetvár, town in Hungary
 Sighetu Marmației/Máramarossziget, city in Romania

Other
 Sziget Festival, an international annual pop/rock festival organised on Hajógyári-sziget (Shipyard Island), Óbuda, Budapest